Moreton Bay is a locality split between the City of Brisbane and the City of Redland, both in Queensland, Australia. The locality includes all of the bay Moreton Bay (water and islands) between the mainland of the City of Brisbane and the City of Redland across to the western coast of Moreton Island and the western coast of North Stradbroke Island (including some islands but excluding others).

Geography 
The extent of the locality within the City of Brisbane is:

 in the north-west, the northernmost coastal point of Brighton 
 in the south-west, the southernmost coastal point of Lota 
 in the north-east, the northwesternmost coastal point of Moreton Island 
 in the south-east, the northwesternmost coastal point of North Stradbroke Island 

and includes the following uninhabited islands (from north to south):

 Mud Island (Bungumba) 
 St Helena Island (Noogoon) 
 Green Island (Milwarpa) 

The extent of the locality within the City of Redland is:
 in the north-west, the northernmost coastal point of Thorneside 
 in the south-west, the southernmost coastal point of Redland Bay 
 in the north-east, the northwesternmost coastal point of North Stradbroke Island 
 in the south-east, the southwesternmost coastal point of North Stradbroke Island that is north of Russell Island (one of the excluded areas below 

and includes the following uninhabited islands from north to south:
 Goat Island
 Cassim Island
 Snipe Island
 Garden Island
 Pannikin Island
 Long Island
 Lagoon Island
 Redbill Island

but excludes the following islands (some inhabited, some not), from north to south:
 Peel Island
 Coochiemudlo Island
 Macleay Island & Perulpa Island
 Lamb Island
 Karragarra Island
 Russell Island & Willes Island & Double Island

The list of excluded islands or island groups above are separate localities within the City of Redland, all are inhabited with the exception of Peel Island, which was formerly inhabited but now is a protected area.

History 
The locality name of Moreton Bay draws its name from the bay of the same name, which was named by Lieutenant James Cook, commander of HMS Endeavour, after James Douglas, 14th Earl of Morton, the President of the Royal Society who had helped to negotiate a grant of £4000 to finance the expedition.

See also
 List of tramways in Queensland

References

External links 
 

Suburbs of the City of Brisbane
Localities in Queensland